Jog is a Raga in Hindustani classical music. It is one of the more popular ragas appearing often in films. Sometimes, experts assign this raga to be a member of Kafi thaat.

Structure 
Raga Jog omits the second and the sixth intervals, Ri and Dha, making it pentatonic, or Audav in nature. In ascending, it uses Shuddha Ga, and in descending, it uses Komal Ga. It takes Raga Tilang for its base which itself is derived from Khamaj.

The Arohana is: Sa Ga Ma Pa ni(komal) Sa'
The Avarohana is: Sa' ni(komal) Pa Ma Ga(shuddha) Ma ga(komal) Sa

In the notes of the Western scale in the key of C, these roughly correspond to C, E, F, G, B, C; C, B, G, F, E, F, E, C.

Time of the day 
The raga is played during the late evening (9 PM – 12 night):
2nd Prahar of the night,
Ratri ka Dwitiya Prahar

Notable recordings in raga Jog 
Pramadhavanam by Raveendran Master in His Highness Abdullah,
Ravi Shankar on his 1956 album Three Ragas,
Hariprasad Chaurasia & Zakir Hussain,
Ali Akbar Khan & L Subramanian.

Film songs

Language: English

Non-film songs 

Hindustani ragas
Articles containing video clips